Khajuraho is a Lok Sabha constituency in Madhya Pradesh state in central India. Presently it covers the entire Panna district and parts of Chhatarpur and Katni districts.

Vidhan Sabha segments
Presently, after delimitation of the parliamentary constituencies in 2008, this constituency comprises the following eight Vidhan Sabha segments:

From 1976-2008, Khajuraho Lok Sabha constituency comprised the following eight Vidhan Sabha (Legislative Assembly) segments:

Members of Lok Sabha

Election results

General Elections 2019

Lok Sabha 2014

Lok Sabha 2009

Lok Sabha 1957
 Seat One.
 Motilal Malviya (INC) : 144,834 votes  
 Nathoo Ram (BJS) : 73,024
 Seat Two
 Ram Sahai (Congress) : 122,970 votes 
 Pyare	M (PSP) : 72,962

See also
 Chhatarpur district
 Katni district
 List of Constituencies of the Lok Sabha
 Panna district

References

External links
Khajuraho lok sabha  constituency election 2019 result details

Lok Sabha constituencies in Madhya Pradesh
Chhatarpur district
Katni district
Panna district